Vasko Ševaljević (born 21 June 1988) is a Montenegrin handball player for Redbergslids IK and the Montenegrin national team.

References

External links

1988 births
Living people
Montenegrin male handball players
Sportspeople from Cetinje
Liga ASOBAL players
Handball-Bundesliga players
SDC San Antonio players
Expatriate handball players
Montenegrin expatriate sportspeople in Belarus
Montenegrin expatriate sportspeople in France
Montenegrin expatriate sportspeople in Germany
Montenegrin expatriate sportspeople in Spain